Pterothrixidia is a monotypic snout moth genus described by Hans Georg Amsel in 1954. Its one species, described by Philogène Auguste Joseph Duponchel in 1836, is Pterothrixidia rufella. It is found in France, Spain, Switzerland, Italy, the Balkan Peninsula, Ukraine, Russia, Kazakhstan, Turkey and Iran.

The wingspan is about 27–28 mm.

References

Phycitini
Monotypic moth genera
Moths of Europe
Moths of Asia
Moths described in 1836
Pyralidae genera
Taxa named by Hans Georg Amsel